Rio Tinto Zhombe High School is a school in Kwekwe District of the Midlands Province in Zimbabwe.

It is a mixed (Day and Boarding) school for both sexes.

Rio Tinto Zhombe High
School is at Zhombe Growth Point 60 km northwest of Kwekwe and
80 km southeast of Gokwe closer to a township named Joel in Zhombe. The school is on the high road and is recognized by a sign post with a name and a logo.

Background
It was the first secondary school in Zhombe Tribal Trust Land now Zhombe Communal land

Construction began in 1976 and ended in 1978. The first batch of students began in January 1977. It was an F2 Technical Secondary School then, the system phased out now.

RioZim Foundation built the school with the then government of Rhodesia's MIDLAND S PROVINCIAL AUTHORITY helping by injecting $20 000 in the project in 1976. However the school was owned by RioZim Foundation for 5 years. It was handed over to the then Mashambazhou District Council, now Zibagwe Rural District Council in 1982.

Operations

The school opened to students in 1977. 
It offers
educational services up to
Form 6.
It is the only conversional boarding school in Zhombe.

The pass rate is very good. In 2014 the school was 84th of the top 100 secondary schools  Zimbabwe.

Facilities 
Rio Tinto Zhombe High School has building facilities which are classrooms, science laboratories, computer laboratories, library, staffroom, girls hostels, boys hostels, dining hall, ric hall.

The school has the following sports play ground:

 Soccer field
 Tennis court
 Basketball court
 Netball field
 Volleyball field
 Track and Field Anthete

Alumni

References

High schools in Zimbabwe
Educational institutions established in 1977
1977 establishments in Rhodesia
Kwekwe District